Hermann Kubik (born 27 January 1907) was an Austrian rower. He competed in the men's double sculls event at the 1936 Summer Olympics.

References

1907 births
Year of death missing
Austrian male rowers
Olympic rowers of Austria
Rowers at the 1936 Summer Olympics
Place of birth missing